"Strangers in the Night" is a song.

Strangers in the Night may also refer to:

 Strangers in the Night (Frank Sinatra album)
 Strangers in the Night (UFO album)
 "Strangers in the Night", a song by Interpol re-titled as "C'mere"
 "747 (Strangers in the Night)" a song by British heavy metal band Saxon
 Strangers in the Night (film), a 1944 film directed by Anthony Mann
 "Strangers in the Night" (Modern Family), an episode from the TV series Modern Family
 "Strangers in the Night", an episode from the TV series ALF